Robert Julio Garcia (born December 2, 1977) is an American educator and politician serving as the U.S. representative for California's 42nd congressional district since 2023. A member of the Democratic Party, he served as the 28th mayor of Long Beach, California from 2014 to 2022. Garcia was both the city's youngest and first elected openly LGBT mayor, as well as the first Latino to hold the office. He is the second person of color to be mayor of Long Beach, after Republican Eunice Sato, a Japanese-American who served from 1980 to 1982. Garcia is the first Peruvian-American to be elected to Congress, and is one of the first two fully Latino LGBT members of Congress (along with George Santos).
A former member of the Long Beach City Council, Garcia was vice mayor from 2012 to 2014.

Early life
Garcia was born in Lima. He immigrated to the United States with his mother at age 5. His mother and aunt worked in many jobs, such as housekeepers, to support the family. Garcia attended California State University, Long Beach, where he became president of the Associated Students, was an active member of the Delta Chi fraternity, and graduated with a degree in communication studies.

He continued his education at the University of Southern California where he received a Master's Degree, and later became a public information officer at Long Beach City College. Garcia received his Doctor of Education degree in educational policy from California State University, Long Beach, in 2010. He has taught courses in communication and public policy at the University of Southern California, California State University, Long Beach, and Long Beach City College.

In 2007, Garcia founded the Long Beach Post, a website devoted to local news and sports reporting. The site soon became popular with local political figures and community leaders and gave him increased local prominence. He sold the website before being elected mayor.

Garcia was the California Youth Coordinator for George W. Bush's 2000 presidential campaign. He also founded the Long Beach Young Republicans in 2005. Describing himself as socially liberal and fiscally conservative, Garcia guided and organized the Young Republicans, which developed a charter that was recognized as an official club by the Los Angeles County Republicans. Garcia also worked as an aide to Republican former vice mayor Frank Colonna when he was on the City Council and ran Colonna's unsuccessful bid in the 2006 Long Beach, California mayoral election.

Garcia changed his party registration to Democratic in 2007 before being elected to office. He and his family originally registered as Republicans when they became citizens in admiration of President Ronald Reagan signing the Immigration Reform and Control Act of 1986.

In the past, Garcia has been accused of not embracing his time as a registered Republican. More recently, he has said he and his family were proud to partake in the American political process, especially the party of Reagan, since it had helped them gain legal immigration status and become U.S. citizens.

Professional career

Before and during his election to the Long Beach City Council, Garcia was a member of the public policy and communications faculty at the University of Southern California, and taught communication studies at California State University, Long Beach and Long Beach City College.

Long Beach City Council (2009–2014)

In 2009, Garcia defeated six other candidates, including a former First District Councilmember, to win the seat vacated when Bonnie Lowenthal was elected to the California State Assembly in 2008. He was reelected in April 2010 by more than 40 percentage points.

In July 2012, he was unanimously elected to a two-year term as Vice Mayor by the City Council, becoming the first Latino Vice Mayor in Long Beach and the youngest in the City's history.

During his time as a councilmember, Garcia authored or cosponsored more than 20 pieces of legislation, including the City's first Equal Benefits Ordinance, a ban on smoking at bus stops and at farmers' markets, a proposal to extend increased preferences to veterans in civil service hiring, and a broad-ranging arts initiative that eliminated restrictions on street performances, and reduced the business license tax for artists and other home-based businesses. He also showed support for both the business community and labor unions, voting to support Project Labor Agreements at the Long Beach Airport, Port of Long Beach and for the Gerald Desmond Bridge, supporting the expansion of the Middle Harbor Terminal, and working to improve infrastructure in commercial corridors. He has shown interest in government reform and fiscal accountability, and supported the City Manager's efforts to consolidate departments.

Garcia's support of the 2010 Long Beach Downtown Community Plan was criticized by some affordable housing advocates, who argued that the plan should be delayed to perform an economic study on affordable housing incentives. In response, Garcia argued that delaying the plan would be costly to the city, and that the economic study could be done separately. The plan passed the City Council, 7-2.

In 2011, Garcia spearheaded the effort to name a planned park in Long Beach's 1st District after murdered San Francisco Supervisor and LGBT civil rights icon Harvey Milk. The park, since named Harvey Milk Promenade Park, opened in 2013. Garcia has received national attention for his socially progressive views and the culturally diverse communities he represents, being young, Latino, and gay. He was featured in CNN's 2009 special "Latino in America," and was named to the "40 under 40 list" by the national gay news magazine The Advocate.

In January 2013, Garcia was appointed to the California Coastal Commission.

Mayor of Long Beach (2014–2022)

Elections
In July 2013, after Bob Foster announced he would not seek reelection, Garcia announced his candidacy and entered the race for Long Beach mayor. He received 25.4% of the vote in the April 8, 2014, election, finishing first in a field of 10 mayoral candidates. In the runoff election between Garcia and Damon Dunn (22.3% of the vote) on June 3, Garcia won with 52% of the vote, and took office on July 15.

Garcia was reelected on April 11, 2018, with about 80% of the vote.

Tenure
Garcia's first 100 days as mayor were characterized by a focus on education and seating commissioners to fill vacancies on citizen commissions. He committed the City of Long Beach to joining local educational institutions as a signatory to the Long Beach College Promise, and announced a goal of universal preschool enrollment and doubling the number of internships in the city for local students. He appointed more than 60 commissioners, creating the most diverse slate of commissioners in the city's history. A majority of his appointments were women. His State of the City address used a large digital screen to display data and graphics, winning acclaim for its visual appeal and use of technology. The speech highlighted education, economic development, and sustainability, among other issues.

Garcia's focus on economic development has been exemplified by his revival of the inactive Economic Development Commission, and acquisition of a $3 million innovation grant from Bloomberg Philanthropies During his first term, construction on a new civic center began, and voters approved a temporary sales tax to support infrastructure and public safety, which Garcia initiated. Garcia focused on economic development, public safety and infrastructure, education, technology, and building housing.

As mayor, Garcia proposed 10 ballot initiatives for public safety, infrastructure, term limits, and creating ethics and redistricting commissions, among other things; each passed. This includes Measure BBB, which limited the number of terms the mayor can serve.

International trade and human rights
Garcia led America's second largest container port, the Port of Long Beach. During his tenure, he worked to implement climate goals and traveled the world to establish trade relationships with multinational companies and trading nations, including Japan, Korea, China, Taiwan, Singapore, Cambodia, Vietnam, Chile, Denmark, Peru, Switzerland and Germany. He visited Peru and Honduras in partnership with the Victory Institute and the State Department on missions to expand LGBTQ rights worldwide. He also visited Israel and the West Bank.

Labor and worker rights

Garcia fostered the first citywide Project Labor Agreement (PLA) between the City of Long Beach, the Los Angeles/Orange Counties Building and the Construction Trades Council to promote opportunities for local-hire on local-capital construction projects. Since its approval and implementation, 25 construction projects valued at more than $146 million have been built by a local labor workforce.

Garcia also supported the unionization of cannabis and hotel workers and the organization of dock and port laborers, and fought against attempts in the city to contract work outside of the community. He supported organized labor to increase workers' minimum wage before the California State Legislature took action. Most recently, he worked to pass the city's first recall and retention plan in response to workers laid off due to the COVID-19 pandemic.

Environment and climate change

In 2015, Garcia signed the Global Covenant of Mayors, a global coalition working to collectively reduce greenhouse gas emissions and enhance resilience to climate change. Following his lead, Long Beach continued its dedication to climate change action and developed its first-ever Climate Action and Adaptation Plan (CAAP). Through the CAAP, the City of Long Beach has partnered with over 30 local businesses to help reduce their environmental impacts. These Certified Green Businesses follow guidelines for energy and water conservation, pollution prevention, waste management, employee commute, and community education.

During his tenure, the Long Beach Port closely adhered to the Clean Air Action Plan. More recently, Long Beach banned Styrofoam, plastic straws, and plastic bags.

Public health

Garcia has said that he views access to health care as a fundamental human right and has been a strong supporter of Medicare for All. In 2020, he and Oakland Mayor Libby Schaaf formed Mayors 4 Medicare, a coalition of U.S. mayors dedicated to ensuring people across the country have access to health care.

Under Garcia, Long Beach also launched the Long Beach Black Infant Health Program, which aims to address the problem of poor birth outcomes affecting Black mothers and their infants.

State and national politics

In December 2017, Garcia endorsed Gavin Newsom for governor, making him the first elected Latino to do so.

In May 2019, Garcia joined Newsom, Representative Barbara Lee and others in becoming a California state co-chair for Kamala Harris's 2020 presidential campaign. He was the only mayor to join state leaders as a co-chair. In July 2020, after Harris bowed out of the Democratic primary and she and Garcia endorsed Joe Biden, he went on to join the Latino Leadership Committee for the Biden campaign.

In July 2020, inspired by the George Floyd protests, a petition to recall Garcia was approved by the Long Beach City Clerk. Activists cited Garcia's "immoral leadership" and financial support from the Long Beach Police Officers Association, the union that represents local police. On November 9, 2020, the mayoral recall was canceled in the wake of the national election. Activist Franklin Sims claimed he and his supporters were being intimidated.

In August 2020, Garcia was selected as one of 17 speakers to jointly deliver the keynote address at the 2020 Democratic National Convention. This made him, Sam Park, and Malcolm Kenyatta the first openly gay speakers in a keynote slot at a Democratic National Convention.

U.S House of Representatives

Elections

2022 

On December 22, 2021, Garcia announced his candidacy for California's 42nd congressional district in the United States House of Representatives in 2022. The district had previously been the 47th, represented by Alan Lowenthal. Lowenthal and his colleague Lucille Roybal-Allard both announced that they were not running for reelection as California lost a congressional seat for the first time in its history. Garcia chose to swear his oath of office using the U.S. Constitution, a picture of his parents and an original Superman #1 comic.

Caucus memberships 

 Congressional Progressive Caucus
 Congressional Equality Caucus (co-chair)

Personal life

On December 22, 2018, Garcia married his longtime boyfriend, California State University, Long Beach professor Matthew Mendez.

Electoral history

City Council

Mayor

See also

List of Hispanic and Latino Americans in the United States Congress
 List of mayors of the 50 largest cities in the United States
 List of Democratic National Convention keynote speakers

References

External links

 Robert Garcia for Congress campaign website 

 

|-

|-

|-

1977 births
21st-century American politicians
American LGBT city council members
American politicians of Peruvian descent
California Democrats
California State University, Long Beach alumni
California State University, Long Beach faculty
California city council members
Democratic Party members of the United States House of Representatives from California
Gay politicians
Hispanic and Latino American mayors in California
Hispanic and Latino American members of the United States Congress
LGBT Hispanic and Latino American people
LGBT mayors of places in the United States
LGBT members of the United States Congress
Peruvian LGBT people
Living people
Long Beach City College faculty
Mayors of Long Beach, California
People from Covina, California
People from Long Beach, California
Peruvian emigrants to the United States
University of Southern California alumni
University of Southern California faculty